Alcones, formerly known as Los Halcones is a Chilean village, currently part of Marchihue, Cardenal Caro Province.

References

Populated places in Cardenal Caro Province